"XXL" is a song co-written and recorded by American country music artist Keith Anderson.  It was released in July 2005 as the second single from the album Three Chord Country and American Rock & Roll.  The song reached #23 on the Billboard  Hot Country Songs chart.  The song was written by Anderson and Bob DiPiero.

Music video
A video for the song was made and features a cameo from Mötley Crüe drummer Tommy Lee, along with former NFL running back Eddie George.

Chart performance

References

2005 singles
2004 songs
Keith Anderson songs
Songs written by Keith Anderson
Songs written by Bob DiPiero
Arista Nashville singles